Haplochromis microchrysomelas is a species of cichlid endemic to Lake Kivu in Rwanda.  This species can reach a length of  SL.

References

microchrysomelas
Fish described in 1994
Taxonomy articles created by Polbot